The Toronto Wolfpack are a Canadian professional rugby league club based in Toronto, Ontario, who compete in the North American Rugby League.

The club originally competed in the British rugby league system but withdrew in the 2020 Super League season due to "overwhelming financial challenges" caused by the COVID-19 pandemic.

The club is the first North American team to play in the Rugby Football League system, the first fully professional rugby league team in Canada, and the first transatlantic rugby league team.

History

2014–2016: Origins and foundation
The Rugby Football League first received an application from a Canadian consortium based in Toronto, led by the Chairman of the national governing body Canada Rugby League Eric Perez in 2014 to compete in the United Kingdom's third tier of professional rugby league. Perez was denied permission to join the first-tier Super League directly, and instead attempted to build the club up to the point where it can be promoted. A press conference was held on 27 April 2016 at which details on the franchise, which began to play in 2017, were revealed. The team will be the first professional rugby league team to be based in Canada. A group of 10 businessmen, consisting of mostly Canadians and Australian mining millionaire David Argyle, own the club, having paid around $500,000 to be granted admission to the rugby league. A condition for the team to join the British rugby league system was that they would be responsible for covering travel and accommodation expenses incurred for all visiting teams outside of the first division Super League.

It was suggested that it was an attractive market as Canada has the largest amount of rugby league followers outside of Australia, France, New Zealand and the United Kingdom. The club plans to play in blocks of four home matches, four away matches, and cover all expenses for visiting teams throughout the season.

The Wolfpack held tryouts in five cities across North America starting 24 September; those were: Philadelphia, Tampa, Kingston, Vancouver, and Toronto itself. From these tryouts 18 athletes were selected to take part in a tour in England, culminating in a victorious game against an amateur club, the Brighouse Rangers. Three players won professional contracts with the Wolfpack Rugby League Team following the tour, with another round of tryouts to be held in Toronto in the following few months for the unsuccessful trialists.

The Toronto Wolfpack Rugby League Team owns rights to all broadcasts of their matches. In Canada, games are broadcast on CBC Live and on Game TV, in the USA games are broadcast on Eleven Sports, and in the UK and Ireland Premier Sports broadcasts through the Sky Network.

2017–2020: Seasons in the British leagues

On 22 January 2017, the Wolfpack played their first professional game, a pre-season friendly against Hull F.C. at the KCOM Stadium. The final score was 26–20 in favour of Hull. The club played its first competitive match on February 25, 2017, resulting in a 14–6 victory in the third round of the Challenge Cup against the amateur NCL champions: Siddal.

On 4 March, Toronto played its first League 1 match, away at London Skolars. They won the match 76–0. Their first home match was played on May 6, where they defeated Oxford in front of 6,281 fans at Lamport Stadium.

The Wolfpack would go on to have a successful campaign, winning all fifteen of their regular season matches and five out of seven playoff games. The Wolfpack finished the season with 41 points from 22 games and points difference of +921.

Promotion to the Championship, and the Kingston Press League 1 Title, was secured on 9 September 2017 with the Wolfpack defeating Barrow Raiders 26–2 in front of 7,972 spectators. They closed with a win against Doncaster in front of a record attendance of 8,456.

The following season saw continued success by the Wolfpack; winning the league leaders shield in the championship competition. Following a round 4 defeat to London Broncos they put together an 18-game winning streak from March 2018  which was eventually broken with a home defeat to Featherstone Rovers in late July. They performed creditably in the Super 8s with five wins from seven games, defeating Super League sides Widnes Vikings and Leeds Rhinos. However, they fell short of automatic promotion on points difference and London Broncos beat the Wolfpack 4–2 at Lamport Stadium in the Million Pound Game, condemning the Wolfpack to another season in the Championship.

On October 5, 2019, the Wolfpack were promoted to Super League for the first time in club history after their 24–6 victory over Featherstone Rovers in the 2019 Million Pound Game.

In November 2019, the Wolfpack made international headlines when they signed dual-code international Sonny Bill Williams on a two-year deal. The signing came in the wake of Williams' third appearance in a Rugby World Cup and saw him return to Rugby League, the sport where his career began.

2020-present: Expulsion and revival
In July 2020, Toronto Wolfpack withdrew from the 2020 Super League due to financial difficulties and new logistics needed for international travel caused by the COVID-19 pandemic in the United Kingdom.

The club was given a chance to resubmit a bid for a place in the 2021 Super League season but the bid for readmission was rejected on 2 November 2020 resulting in the team's removal from the league. Subsequently, the Wolfpack made an announcement that they would cease operations. Following the vote, a consortium of potential new owners led by Carlo LiViolsi backed out of a deal to purchase the Wolfpack from financially struggling owner David Argyle. Consequently, it was announced in November 2020 that the team would cease operations.

On 31 March 2021, it was announced that a private investor group had purchased the Wolfpack and that they would be resuming play in the newly formed North American Rugby League.

Stadium

The team's home stadium is Lamport Stadium in Toronto and known as The Den for Wolfpack matches. The stadium seats 9,600. The stadium was opened in 1975 and has an artificial field. In addition to the two rugby codes, it has hosted soccer and lacrosse. The team signed a three-year lease to play at the stadium. The Toronto Wolfpack supporters group can be found in Section 35.

Lamport Stadium has been used by the team for nearly all their home games in Canada. However, during their 2018 season the Wolfpack relocated one of their home games to Fletcher's Fields in Markham, as Lamport Stadium was undergoing field resurfacing work.  The team explored options to improve the home stadium, including holding preliminary discussions about moving their home games to BMO Field, renovating Lamport Stadium or building a new stadium.

In addition to home games played in Greater Toronto Area, the team played a "home game" at New River Stadium in London for the 2018, and 2019 seasons. The Wolfpack played at these venues in an effort to boost the popularity of the team, and sport in London.  Additionally, in their debut Super League campaign in 2020 the Wolfpack hosted scheduled "home" games on the road at neutral venues, due to the weather conditions not being suitable in Eastern Canada for rugby league until April. Toronto played scheduled "home" games at: Headingley Stadium, Leeds as a double header with Leeds Rhinos; the Halliwell Jones Stadium, Warrington; and Bootham Crescent, York as a double header with York City Knights. The York game was originally scheduled to be at the new York Community Stadium, as the grounds' inaugural game, however the stadium was not ready in time.

Logistics
As none of the players on the roster are from Toronto or Canada, the team stays at the George Brown College residence in West Don Lands that is the former site of the 2015 Pan American Games Athletes' Village and trains at Lamport Stadium. Away teams stay at York University residence and train on York University athletic facilities. Through a sponsorship deal with Air Transat, the team covers the travel and accommodation cost for all of the away teams. Toronto Wolfpack continued to cover expenses for the visiting teams in the 2018 season.

Toronto signed an agreement with Brighouse Rangers to share their training ground for pre-seasons and while the Wolfpack are in the UK for away fixtures for 2017. At the end of the 2017 season the Wolfpack confirmed their intention to switch to a base in Manchester, UK, during the 2018 season, and in 2018 announced the deepening of their partnership with Manchester Metropolitan University and its community. Until 2020, Manchester served as the Wolfpack's home in the United Kingdom, with the club training at Hopwood Hall College.

Media and promotion 
Toronto Wolfpack games were broadcast on Canadian specialty channel GameTV, with further digital rights extended to CBC Sports with games streamed on the CBC Sports website. Matches are also archived on the Toronto Wolfpack YouTube Channel.

All Toronto Wolfpack games were broadcast live in the UK on Sky Sports - Arena which reaches 11 million homes across the Sky Network. In the USA Eleven Sports send broadcasts into 50 million homes.

Kit sponsors and manufacturers

Players

Staff

Coaching staff

List of head coaches

Club officials

Records

Individual
 Most tries in a match: 
5:
 Liam Kay v.  York City Knights (1 July 2017)
 Most goals in a match: 
13:
 Craig Hall v.  Doncaster (9 April 2017)
 Most points in a match: 
38:
 Craig Hall v.  Hemel Stags (15 July 2017)
 Most drop goals in a season: 
2 (2 players):
 Ryan Brierley and Gareth O'Brien (2018 Championship)
 Most goals in a season: 
170:
 Craig Hall (2017 League 1)
 Most tries in a season: 
27 (2 players):
 Liam Kay (2017 League 1) and Matty Russell (2019 Championship)
 Most points in a season: 
436:
 Craig Hall (2017 League 1)

Team records
Biggest win: 
82–6 v.  Doncaster (April 9, 2017)
Biggest loss: 
66-10 v.  Warrington Wolves (May 13, 2018)

Attendance records
Highest home attendance: 
9,974 v.  Featherstone Rovers (at Lamport Stadium, 5 October 2019)

Seasons

Honours
 RFL
RFL Championship
Winners (2): 2018,  2019
Million Pound Game
Winners (1): 2019
Runners-up (1): 2018
RFL Championship Leaders' Shield
Winners (2): 2018,  2019
RFL League 1
Winners (1): 2017
 NARL
Canada Cup
Winners (1): 2021

See also

Canada national rugby league team
Canada Rugby League
Ontario Rugby League
Ottawa Aces
Rugby league in Canada

Notes

References

External links

 

2016 establishments in Ontario
Canadian rugby league teams
Rugby clubs established in 2016
Rugby teams in Toronto